Marshall Ney King (December 1849 – October 19, 1911) was an American professional baseball player who played as a center fielder for two seasons in the National Association, from 1871 to 1872.  King played for the Chicago White Stockings and Troy Haymakers.  He was born in Lansingburgh, New York, and died at the age of 61 in Troy, New York.  He is interred at Oakwood Cemetery located in Troy.

References

External links

Major League Baseball center fielders
Troy Haymakers (NABBP) players
Chicago White Stockings (NABBP) players
Chicago White Stockings players
Troy Haymakers players
19th-century baseball players
People from Lansingburgh, New York
1849 births
1911 deaths
Baseball players from New York (state)
Sportspeople from Troy, New York
Burials at Oakwood Cemetery (Troy, New York)